Martin Campbell (born 26 July 1990) is a Scottish badminton player from BC Adliswil Zurich. Campbell started playing badminton when he was around seven years old, and joined the national team in 2008. He was the bronze medalist at the 2008 Commonwealth Youth Games in Pune, India, and competed at the 2014 and 2018 Commonwealth Games. He won his first National Championships title in 2015.

Campbell graduated from Loughborough University with a first class honours degree.

Campbell announced his retirement from full-time badminton in July 2018, and amassed 29 Scotland caps since 2010.

Achievements

BWF International Challenge/Series 
Men's doubles

Mixed doubles

  BWF International Challenge tournament
  BWF International Series tournament
  BWF Future Series tournament

References

External links 
 

1990 births
Living people
Sportspeople from Edinburgh
Scottish male badminton players
Badminton players at the 2018 Commonwealth Games
Badminton players at the 2014 Commonwealth Games
Commonwealth Games competitors for Scotland
Alumni of Loughborough University